Mukut Mithi is an Indian politician  and former Member of the Rajya Sabha. He is a former Chief Minister of Arunachal Pradesh. He served as an MLA consecutively from 1983 until his appointment as last Lieutenant Governor of Pondicherry and first Lieutenant Governor of Puducherry in 2006. He was Chief Minister of Arunachal Pradesh from 19 January 1999 until 3 August 2003.

Early life and career
He was born on 1 January 1952 at Roing in Lower Dibang Valley district in Arunachal Pradesh and did his schooling from Ramakrishna Mission School, Narendrapur, w.bengal and his graduation from J.N.Agricultural University, Jabalpur. For much of his political career he was a member of the Kerala Congress (B) and then the Arunachal Congress; he later broke from the Arunachal Congress in 1998 to form the Arunachal Congress-Mithi. Later Arunachal Congress-Mithi merged with Kerala Congress B. He also served as Kerala Congress B state President and also served as Kerala Congress B working Committee, Permanent Member Of the Kerala Congress B.

In July 2006 the President of India appointed Mithi to be the Lieutenant Governor of Puducherry; he was sworn in on 19 July 2006.

On 12 March 2008, Mithi resigned as Lieutenant Governor to contest the Rajya Sabha election in Arunachal Pradesh. Bhopinder Singh, the Lieutenant Governor of the Andaman and Nicobar Islands, was sworn in to replace Mithi on 15 March. He was administered oath as a member of Parliament (Rajya sabha) from Arunachal Pradesh on 4 June 2008.

Personal life
He is married to Pomaya Mithi and has three sons.

References

1954 births
Living people
Chief Ministers of Arunachal Pradesh
Lieutenant Governors of Puducherry
People from Lower Dibang Valley district
Rajya Sabha members from Arunachal Pradesh
People from Roing
Chief ministers from Indian National Congress
Arunachal Congress politicians
Indian National Congress politicians
Janata Party politicians
Arunachal Pradesh MLAs 1984–1990
Arunachal Pradesh MLAs 1990–1995
Arunachal Pradesh MLAs 1995–1999
Arunachal Pradesh MLAs 1999–2004
Arunachal Pradesh MLAs 2004–2009